Centrolepis exserta is a species of plant in the Restionaceae family and is found in Western Australia.

It blooms between April and August producing green-red-brown coloured flowers.

It is found along the margins of watercourses, waterholes and seepage areas in the Kimberley region of Western Australia where it grows in damp sandy soils over laterite.

References

exserta
Plants described in 1817
Flora of Western Australia
Poales of Australia